CRRC Zhuzhou (formerly CSR Zhuzhou) may refer to:
 CRRC Zhuzhou Institute Co., Ltd., formerly Zhuzhou Electric Locomotive Research Institute, CSR Zhuzhou Electric Locomotive Research Institute Co., Ltd., subsidiary of listed company CRRC Corp. Ltd.
 Zhuzhou CRRC Times Electric, Chinese listed company, indirect subsidiary of CRRC Corp. Ltd.
 CRRC Zhuzhou Locomotive, subsidiary of CRRC Corp. Ltd.

See also
 Zhuzhou Times New Material Technology, a subsidiary of CRRC Zhuzhou Institute

Zhuzhou